"Say What You Will" is a song by English singer-songwriter and electronic music producer James Blake. It was written by Blake, Dominic Maker and Josh Stadlen. Its production was handled by Blake with co-producer Dominic Maker and additional production from Josh Stadlen and Jameela Jamil. The song was released on 22 July 2021 through Republic and Polydor Records, as the lead single from Blake's fifth studio album Friends That Break Your Heart.

Composition
Upon its release, Blake revealed that the song was about "finding peace with who you are and where you're at regardless of how well other people seem to be doing, and the endless feeling of comparison."

On his album commentary with Apple Music, Blake noted the track as "favorite song written in years". He further added:

Kitty Empire of The Guardian called the song as "a mellow anthem about self-worth". Andrew Ryce of Resident Advisor described the track as "an elegant and hopeful song about self-acceptance". Ella Kemp of NME called the track found Blake "at peace with potential haters, relishing criticism and setting himself free by choosing, quite simply, not to care anymore".

Release
Blake announced the single on his Instagram, by sharing a photo of himself in front of a spread of magazines with music video co-star Finneas' face on the covers. "Say What You Will" premiered on BBC Radio 1's Future Sounds with Annie Mac.

Reception
"Say What You Will" received generally positive reviews from music critics. Andrea Cleary of The Irish Times praised Blake's vocal performances and compared it to Minnie Riperton. Nathan Evans of Clash called the track "shows off the magic trick Blake's perfected by now" and commended Blake's vocal performances, described it as "unsettingly beautiful". David Smyth of Evening Standard noted Blake's vocal experimentation on the song. Shaad D'Souza of Pitchfork called the song as the most "arresting" track of its parent album Friends That Break Your Heart.

Music video
An accompanying music video for "Say What You Will" was uploaded to Blake's official YouTube channel on 22 July 2021. It was directed by Bear Damen. The video stars singer and actor Finneas, alongside Blake. In the video, Blake dramatizes his inferiority complex opposite Finneas.

Live performances
Blake performed the track for the first time as an unreleased song during a concert at the Harvey Theater in Brooklyn, New York, United States on 17 December 2019. He also performed it during an Instagram Live session on 6 April 2020.

After the single release, Blake performed "Say What You Will" on the late-night talk show Jimmy Kimmel Live! on 16 September 2021. He also included the song on the setlist of his Friends That Break Your Heart Tour (2021).

References

2021 singles
James Blake (musician) songs
Polydor Records singles
Republic Records singles
Songs written by James Blake (musician)